Gowanbrae is a suburb in Melbourne, Victoria, Australia,  north-west of Melbourne's Central Business District, located within the City of Merri-bek local government area. Gowanbrae recorded a population of 2,971 at the 2021 census.

Gowanbrae is bounded by the Western Ring Road in the north and west, the Tullamarine Freeway in the west, the Albion-Jacana railway line in the south and Moonee Ponds Creek in the east. It is the City of Merri-bek's newest suburb, with residential development started in the 1990s and continuing.

Demographics

According to data from the :

 The most common ancestries in Gowanbrae were Australian 18.3%, English 17.6%, Italian 14.1%, Irish 7.9% and Scottish 4.7%.
 In Gowanbrae, 72.0% of people were born in Australia. The most common countries of birth were Fiji 2.0%, Italy 1.9%, Sri Lanka 1.9%, India 1.5% and China (excludes SARs and Taiwan) 1.4%.
 The most common responses for religion in Gowanbrae were Catholic 41.5%, No Religion, so described 21.2%, Anglican 7.3%, Not stated 7.0% and Eastern Orthodox 4.6%. In Gowanbrae, Christianity was the largest religious group reported overall (67.3%) (this figure excludes not stated responses).
 In Gowanbrae, 67.9% of people only spoke English at home. Other languages spoken at home included Italian 5.7%, Sinhalese 2.2%, Greek 2.0%, Hindi 2.0% and Mandarin 1.7%.
 Gowanbrae could be described as a high income young family suburb with moderate cultural diversity. About one third of citizens in Gowanbrae were born overseas and a high proportion of citizens speak a language other than English at home. There is a high level of religious affiliation in Gowanbrae, with three quarters of citizens proclaiming themselves Christians. In 2001, 400 residents were living in Gowanbrae in about 135 dwellings.

Gowanbrae has a strong and active residents group and website and Facebook page named 'Gowanbrae'. The suburb has a $4 million community and children's centre with views of the city of Melbourne. There is also has a yearly festival which is attended by most of the residents.

Transport

Bus
One bus route services Gowanbrae:

 : Westfield Airport West – Gowanbrae via Melrose Drive and Gowanbrae Drive. Operated by CDC Melbourne. The bus route operates as a demand responsive transport service inside the suburb itself. Introduced in July 2008, no public transport had previously operated in the suburb.

Cycling
The Moonee Ponds Creek Trail and the Western Ring Road Trail provide facilities for recreational and commuting cyclists.

Road
The sole road access to the suburb is from the west via Coventry Street, which passes under the Tullamarine Freeway.

Train
There are no railway stations in Gowanbrae, with Broadmeadows, Jacana and Glenroy stations, all on the Craigieburn line, the nearest stations. The Albion-Jacana railway line forms Gowanbrae's southern border, and is primarily a freight only line, with NSW TrainLink's XPT service to Sydney and V/Line's North East service to Albury the only passenger services on the line.

Tram
The nearest tram route to Gowanbrae is located in nearby Airport West:

 : Westfield Airport West – Flinders Street station (Elizabeth Street Melbourne CBD). Operated by Yarra Trams.

References

Suburbs of Melbourne
Suburbs of the City of Merri-bek